The Tunisian Ambassador in Beijing is the official representative of the Government in Tunis to the Government of China and is also accredited in Pyongyang (North Korea), Phnom Penh (Cambodia) and Vientiane (Laos).

List of representatives 

 China–Tunisia relations

References 

China
Tunisia
Ambassadors